Ashleigh Karaitiana (born 26 June 1992) is a New Zealand and Australian professional basketball player.

College
Karaitiana played college basketball at the University of Hawaii for the Rainbow Wahine in Honolulu, Hawaii. In her last year Karaitiana scored 17 points, making five 3-pointers, and Hawaii throttled UC Davis 78-59 in the Big West Conference Tournament championship game To qualify for the NCAA tournament. They went on to the tournament and lost to UCLA 50-66.

Statistics 

|-
|2012–13
| align="left" |Hawaii
|31
|30
|26.4
|.404
|.314
|.614
|4.4
|1.3
|0.8
|0.1
|2.6
|8.5
|-
|2013–14
| align="left" |Hawaii
|31
|9
|26.7
|.386
|.382
|.703
|5.2
|1.6
|0.6
|0.2
|2.1
|10.4
|-
|2014–15
| align="left"|Hawaii
|31
|30
|30.0
|.346
|.281
|.697
|5.0
|2.5
|1.1
|0.3
|1.8
|10.0
|-
|2015–16
| align="left"|Hawaii
|32
|32
|26.3
|.361
|.323
|.721
|3.9
|2.4
|0.5
|0.3
|1.8
|8.5
|-
|Career
|
|125
|101
|27.3
|.375
|.319
|.681
|4.6
|1.9
|0.7
|0.2
|2.1
|9.3

Career

SEABL
Karaitiana would play her first season in SEABL with the Southern Districts Spartans where she would play two games of the season before returning to Hawaii to graduate in 2016.

WNBL
Karaitiana would begin her WNBL career in her home town of Sydney, signed as a development player with the Sydney Uni Flames for the 2010–11 WNBL season. Karaitiana would then depart to begin her college career in the United States. Karaitiana was signed by the Bendigo Spirit for 2016–17, where she will make her return to the league.

After a two-year absence and giving birth to her first child, Karaitiana returned to the league signing with the Melbourne Boomers for the 2020 season. There, Karaitiana joins several of her Tall Ferns teammates all playing under national team head coach, Guy Molloy.

National Team

Youth Level 
Karaitiana first represented Australia, alongside Elizabeth Cambage at the 2009 Under-19 World Championship in Bangkok, Thailand where Australia placed fifth. She would once again represent the Gems at the 2011 Under-19 World Championship in Chile where they narrowly missed out on the bronze medal, placing fourth.

Senior Level 
Karaitiana has since switched her allegiances to her country of birth and began representing the New Zealand Tall Ferns in 2018. Karaitiana was named to the final roster for the 2019 FIBA Asia Cup.

References

1992 births
Living people
Forwards (basketball)
Australian women's basketball players
New Zealand women's basketball players
Sydney Uni Flames players
Bendigo Spirit players
Melbourne Boomers players
Australian people of New Zealand descent
People educated at Endeavour Sports High School